

This is a list of the National Register of Historic Places listings in Poinsett County, Arkansas.

This is intended to be a complete list of the properties and districts on the National Register of Historic Places in Poinsett County, Arkansas, United States.

There are 19 properties and districts listed on the National Register in the county, and one former listing.

Current listings

|}

Former listings

|}

See also

List of National Historic Landmarks in Arkansas
National Register of Historic Places listings in Arkansas

References

 
Poinsett County